Holmes Beach is a city on Anna Maria Island in Manatee County, Florida, United States. As of the 2020 census, it had a population of 3,010, down from 3,836 at the 2010 census. It is part of the Bradenton-Sarasota-Venice, Florida Metropolitan Statistical Area. The city occupies the central part of Anna Maria Island and is one of three municipalities on the island. The others are Bradenton Beach in the south and Anna Maria in the north.

History
Holmes Beach was named for John E. Holmes Sr., the property developer who started this planned community after World War II. During World War II, Holmes was stationed in Tampa. Holmes obtained the interest of three others, Frank B. Giles of Georgia, Pedar Mickelsen of Minnesota and Francis Karel of Chicago, to help develop it. In 1947 or 1948 a small airport was built. One person had a plane at the airport and used it as an air taxi during the tourist season and was used by residents and visitors taking them to wherever they wanted to go. Holmes Beach was incorporated on March 13, 1950, during a meeting about incorporating with 46 voting in favor, 13 against and 1 in abstention. Opponents of incorporation argued that tax money from cigarettes and liquor sales would be lost along with county assistance for road maintenance. Those in favor of incorporation argued that it would be easier for lenders to finance new construction on the island and give local residents an equal weight for their voice in their own government. Despite a request not to use anyone's name, Holmes Beach was decided on, although names such as Palm City, Mid-Island Beach, Coquina Beach and Tarpon Beach were considered as well. At the end of the meeting the city's first officials were elected.

Manatee Public Beach located at the intersection of Manatee Avenue and Gulf Drive opened in 1952 originally as Manatee County Public Beach. It was managed by a local Kiwanis Club chapter, with all proceeds going to local charity-related initiatives. During the 1950s and 1960s the beach was racially segregated like many others in the Southeastern United States. It is not clear, however, when the beach was officially desegregated. The beach was renamed "Manatee Beach" before being changed to Manatee Public Beach.

In 1954, Holmes Beach annexed the neighboring subdivision communities of Ilexhurst, Jones, and Casanas, bringing the entirety of Anna Maria Island under municipal governments.

An airport that had existed closed in 1973 because of the cost to maintain it and that it needed improvements. Between 1975 and 1980, the airport land was redeveloped by the municipal government.

Geography

Key Royale
Included in the city limits is the adjacent bayside island of Key Royale, formerly known as School Key. It was uninhabited until 1960, when a bridge was built joining it to the Holmes Beach section of Anna Maria Island; development then began.

Demographics

As of the 2000 U.S. Census, there were 4,966 people in 2,538 households, including 1,482 families, in the city. The racial makeup of the city was 98.59% White, 0.12% African American, 0.12% Native American, 0.28% Asian, 0.08% Pacific Islander, 0.22% from other races, and 0.58% from two or more races. Hispanic or Latino of any race were 1.65% of the population.

Of the 2,538 households 13.7% had children under the age of 18 living with them, 49.2% were married couples living together, 6.5% had a female householder with no husband present, and 41.6% were non-families. 34.0% of households were one person and 17.8% were one person aged 65 or older.  The average household size was 1.96 and the average family size was 2.44.

The age distribution was 12.9% under the age of 18, 2.8% from 18 to 24, 20.1% from 25 to 44, 31.0% from 45 to 64, and 33.2% 65 or older.  The median age was 54 years. For every 100 females, there were 90.3 males.  For every 100 females age 18 and over, there were 88.3 males.

The median household income was $45,074 and the median family income was $55,669. Males had a median income of $30,778 versus $25,825 for females. The per capita income for the city was $31,345.  About 1.2% of families and 3.6% of the population were below the poverty line, including 2.3% of those under age 18 and 1.3% of those age 65 or over.

Notable people
 Kathleen Flinn, author 
 Kit Klein, speed skater
 Don Maloney, author
 John B. Roe (1942–2020), member of the Illinois Senate

References

External links
 

Cities in Manatee County, Florida
Anna Maria Island
Beaches of Manatee County, Florida
Sarasota metropolitan area
Cities in Florida
Populated coastal places in Florida on the Gulf of Mexico
1950 establishments in Florida
Beaches of Florida